Sofía Alvarez is an American playwright and screenwriter.

Biography
Sofía Alvarez was born and raised in Baltimore, Maryland. She is the daughter of American journalist and science writer Deborah Rudacille and former Baltimore Sun reporter  and The Wire writer Rafael Alvarez. She attended Bennington College in Bennington, Vermont prior to attending The Juilliard School's Playwriting Program.

Alvarez’s plays include Between Us Chickens (which premiered at the South Coast Repertory in 2011), Life Drawing, The Fish Bowl, NYLON, Friend Art (Second Stage Theater, 2016), The Orphan’s Club, Corpse Pose and LODGE. Her most recent work, Kill Corp premiered in January 2023. Her musical version of William Steig’s classic children’s book, Amos & Boris premiered at South Coast Repertory in 2018.

In 2018, her adaptation of Jenny Han’s bestselling novel To All the Boys I've Loved Before debuted on Netflix. Its sequel To All the Boys: P.S. I Still Love You premiered on February 12, 2020.

Selected plays
 Between Us Chickens 
 Friend Art
 The Fish Bowl
 NYLON
 The Orphan's Club
 Corpse Pose
 LODGE
 Amos & Boris

Filmography
 To All The Boys I've Loved Before
 To All the Boys: P.S. I Still Love You
 Along for the Ride (Directorial debut)

Television
 Man Seeking Woman
 Sirens

References

External links

Living people
American women screenwriters
Juilliard School alumni
Bennington College alumni
Year of birth missing (living people)
21st-century American women writers